The 1987 Preakness Stakes was the 112th running of the Preakness Stakes thoroughbred horse race. The race took place on May 16, 1987, and was televised in the United States on the ABC television network. Alysheba, who was jockeyed by Chris McCarron, won the race by a half length over runner-up Bet Twice. Approximate post time was 5:34 p.m. Eastern Time. The race was run over a fast track in a final time of 1:55-4/5. The Maryland Jockey Club reported total attendance of 87,945, this is recorded as second highest on the list of American thoroughbred racing top attended events for North America in 1987.

Payout 

The 112th Preakness Stakes Payout Schedule

$2 Exacta:  (6–1) paid   $23.00
$2 Trifecta:   (6-1-9) paid   $80.70

The full chart 

 Winning Breeder: Preston Madden; (KY) 
 Final Time: 1:55.80
 Track Condition: Fast
 Total Attendance: 87,945

See also 

 1987 Kentucky Derby

References

External links 

 

1987
1987 in horse racing
1987 in American sports
1987 in sports in Maryland
Horse races in Maryland